Scott Ramsey may refer to:

Scott Ramsey (cinematographer) in Little Red Riding Hood (1997 film)
Scott Ramsey (musician) on With Abandon

See also
Scott Ramsay (disambiguation)